The white-faced barbet or black-backed barbet (Lybius minor) is a species of bird in the Lybiidae family.
It is found in Gabon, Angola, Zambia, Republic of the Congo and Democratic Republic of the Congo. The habitat it is normally found in is riverine woodland and forest edges.

The common name 'white-faced barbet' recently applied to the species Pogonornis macclounii, which has since been relegated to a subspecies of Lybius minor.

References

black-backed barbet
Birds of Central Africa
black-backed barbet
black-backed barbet
Taxonomy articles created by Polbot
Taxobox binomials not recognized by IUCN